Diego Martin West is a parliamentary electoral district in Trinidad and Tobago in the north-west of Trinidad. It has been represented since the 1991 general election by Keith Rowley of the People's National Movement (PNM).

Constituency profile 
The constituency was created prior to the 1966 general election. It borders the constituencies of Diego Martin North/East and Diego Martin Central, as well as the Caribbean Sea and Gulf of Paria. The main towns are Carenage, Westmoorings, Chaguaramas, and it contains the islands of Gaspar Grande, Monos, Huevos and Chacachacare. It had an electorate of 29,349 as of 2015.

Members of Parliament 
This constituency has elected the following members of the House of Representatives of Trinidad and Tobago:

Election results

Elections in the 2020s

Elections in the 2010s

References 

Constituencies of the Parliament of Trinidad and Tobago